George Clayton may refer to:

 George Clayton (writer), a writer who wrote a book about angels
 George W. Clayton, a businessman and philanthropist in Denver, Colorado
 George Clayton Johnson, an American science fiction writer
 Christopher Clayton (businessman) (George Christopher Clayton, 1869–1945), British scientist, industrialist and politician
 George Clayton (courtier), see Michael Bowes-Lyon, 18th Earl of Strathmore and Kinghorne
 George Clayton (minister), see Alfred Sturge